Daycent is a daily time series biogeochemical model used in agroecosystems to simulate fluxes of carbon and nitrogen between the atmosphere, vegetation, and soil.  It is a daily version of the CENTURY biogeochemical model.

The United States Environmental Protection Agency, United States Department of Agriculture/ARS and the Colorado State University Natural Resource Ecology Lab are currently using the Daycent model to develop a national inventory of N2O emissions from U.S. agricultural soils. This inventory will be compared and contrasted with the existing Intergovernmental Panel on Climate Change (IPCC) agricultural N2O emissions inventory for the United States. Having more accurate data to account for nutrient cycling could have significant implications for public policy associated with the United Nations Framework Convention on Climate Change (UNFCCC) and potential future mitigation efforts in the United States.

Model inputs include daily maximum/minimum air temperature and precipitation, surface soil texture class, and land cover/use data. Model outputs include daily fluxes of various N-gas species (e.g., N2O, NOx, N2); daily CO2 flux from heterotrophic soil respiration; soil organic C and N; net primary productivity; daily water and nitrate (NO3) leaching, and other ecosystem parameters. Daycent has been tested with data from various native and managed systems. In similar studies, comparisons between Daycent simulated data and measured values for annual crop yields, N2O emissions, and NO3 leaching produced r2 values of 0.72, 0.68, and 0.61 respectively.

Other models used for simulating carbon and nitrogen biogeochemistry in agricultural systems include

 DNDC
 EPIC

References

External links

Agriculture
Agronomy
Agriculture and the environment
Systems ecology